Oxynitrilase may refer to:
 (S)-hydroxynitrile lyase, an enzyme
 Hydroxymandelonitrile lyase, an enzyme